Robert Allan Weinberg (born November 11, 1942) is a biologist, Daniel K. Ludwig Professor for Cancer Research at Massachusetts Institute of Technology (MIT), director of the Ludwig Center of the MIT, and American Cancer Society Research Professor. His research is in the area of oncogenes and the genetic basis of human cancer.

Robert Weinberg is also affiliated with the Broad Institute and is a founding member of the Whitehead Institute for Biomedical Research. Weinberg and Eric Lander, a colleague at M.I.T., are co-founders of Verastem, a biopharmaceutical company focused on discovering and developing drugs to treat cancer by targeting cancer stem cells.

Career 
Weinberg earned SB in Biology from Massachusetts Institute of Technology in 1964 and PhD in Biology from the same institute in 1969. He was an instructor in biology at Stillman College in Tuscaloosa, Alabama (1965–1966), and a postdoc in Ernest Winocour's lab at the Weizmann Institute of Science (1969–1970) and in Renato Dulbecco's lab at the Salk Institute for Biological Studies (1970–1972). He joined MIT in 1972.

Research 

He is best known for his discoveries of the first human oncogene Ras and the first tumor suppressor gene Rbp. 371-381, which is partially documented in Natalie Angier′s book, Natural Obsessions, about her year spent in Weinberg's lab.

In the late 20th century, advances in genetics led to the discovery of over one hundred cancer cell types. Cancer cells were noted for their bewildering diversity. It was hard to identify the principles that cancers had in common.

He and Douglas Hanahan wrote the seminal paper, "The Hallmarks of Cancer", published in January 2000, that gave the six requirements for one renegade cell to cause a deadly cancer: In 2011, they published an updated review article entitled "Hallmarks of cancer: the next generation".

Weinberg is well known for both his cancer research and for his mentorship of many eminent scientists, including Tyler Jacks, William C. Hahn, Clifford Tabin and Cornelia Bargmann. He is currently studying cancer cell metastasis.

He is also the author of the textbook The Biology of Cancer published by Garland Science, as well as two important accounts intended for a wider audience: One Renegade Cell: How Cancer Begins (1999) (Science Masters Series); and Racing to the Beginning of the Road: The Search for the Origin of Cancer (1996).

, Weinberg has an h-index of 209 according to Google Scholar.

Awards and honors 
In 1985, Weinberg received the Golden Plate Award of the American Academy of Achievement. Weinberg won the National Medal of Science and the Keio Medical Science Prize in 1997. In 1999, he received the Albert Einstein World Award of Science in recognition of his valuable and pioneering contributions in the field of Biomedical Sciences and for his productive trajectory related to the genetic and molecular basis of neoplastic disease. He was elected to the American Philosophical Society in 2000. He obtained the Wolf Prize in Medicine in 2004 (shared with Roger Y. Tsien), and he is a member of the U.S. National Academy of Sciences. In 2007 he received an honorary doctorate degree in commemoration of Linnaeus from Uppsala University. He is a member of the Royal Swedish Academy of Sciences since 1992.
In 2009 he was presented the Hope Funds Award in Basic Research. In 2013 he was awarded the $3 million Breakthrough Prize in Life Sciences for his work  and in 2021 he received the Japan Prize.

Retractions 
To this day Weinberg has had five research papers retracted where he is listed as a co-author. The retractions include one paper in Cell, one in Cancer Cell, two in Genes & Development and one in Cancer Research.

The reasons given for the retraction of one paper (DOI: 10.1016/j.cell.2009.03.04) include: "Falsification/Fabrication of Data" and "Manipulation of Results".

See also 
 Cancer: The Emperor of All Maladies (2015 PBS film)
 History of cancer
 History of cancer chemotherapy
 The Emperor of All Maladies: A Biography of Cancer

References

External links 
 
 Weinberg's page at the Whitehead Institute 
 Weinberg's page at MIT
 Weinberg Lab
 Bob Weinberg Playlist Appearance on WMBR's Dinnertime Sampler  radio show March 17, 2004
 Weinberg interviewed in American Scientist

Massachusetts Institute of Technology School of Science faculty
Albert Einstein World Award of Science Laureates
21st-century American biologists
National Medal of Science laureates
Recipients of the Pour le Mérite (civil class)
Members of the United States National Academy of Sciences
Members of the Royal Swedish Academy of Sciences
Wolf Prize in Medicine laureates
Living people
1942 births
Jewish American scientists
Whitehead Institute faculty
American oncologists
Scientists from Pittsburgh
Massachusetts Institute of Technology School of Science alumni
Members of the American Philosophical Society
21st-century American Jews
Members of the National Academy of Medicine